The Raptisagar Express  is a Express which runs tri-weekly/weekly between Kochuveli/Ernakulam Junction and Gorakhpur/Barauni in India. This train goes via the cities of Kollam, Alappuzha, Kochi, Thrissur, Palakkad, Coimbatore, Tirupur, Erode, Salem, Chennai Central, Vijayawada, Khammam, Warangal, Ramagundam, Nagpur, Bhopal, Jhansi, Kanpur, Lucknow, Gonda and Basti. The current operator of the train is North Eastern Railway zone/East Central Railway zone of Indian Railways. It is the 10th longest train service of Indian Railways.

Both trains run more than 3200 km per service.

Name of the train
The name "Raptisagar" is given to the train as the train connects the cities Thiruvananthapuram/Cochin which is situated near the Arabian Sea and Gorakhpur/Barauni from where Rapti river flows.

Coach composition
This train has 24 coach cars which includes Second AC and Third AC compartments being air conditioned.

Running days

12511 – Starts from  every Sunday, Tuesday and Friday at 6:35 hrs and reaches Kochuveli on Day 3 at 17:20 hrs.

12512 – Starts from Kochuveli every Sunday, Tuesday and Wednesday at 6:15 hrs and reaches Gorakhpur Junction on Day 3 at 15:20 hrs

Train reverse at Chennai Central

Schedule
The train (12512/12522) leaves Kochuveli/Ernakulam Junction at 6.15/10.15 AM on Tuesday, Wednesday & Sunday/Friday to reach Gorakhpur/Barauni at 3.10/11.50 PM on the 3rd day. The return train (12511/12521) leaves Gorakhpur/Barauni at 6.35 AM/ 11 PM on Thursday, Friday and Sunday/Monday to reach Kochuveli/Ernakulam Junction at 5.15/1 PM on the 3rd/4th day. The train has an average speed of about 58 km/h during its journey.

References

Passenger trains originating from Gorakhpur
Transport in Thiruvananthapuram
Named passenger trains of India
Express trains in India
Rail transport in Madhya Pradesh
Rail transport in Maharashtra
Rail transport in Telangana
Rail transport in Andhra Pradesh
Rail transport in Tamil Nadu
Rail transport in Kerala